Victor Sarasqueta was a firm of fine gun makers based in Eibar, Spain.  It mostly produced originally-designed quality side-by-side shotguns and double rifles based on British designs.

The business was founded in 1883 and in 1902 received a Royal Warrant as a purveyor of guns to the King of Spain.

After being reorganised as Victor Sarasqueta Rifles y Escopetas Especiales, S.A., the business became part of the DiArm Group in the mid 1980s, a company which did not survive that decade.

Other guns made by Felix Sarasqueta and J.J. Sarasqueta also exist, these manufacturers are related to Victor Sarasqueta.

Companies established in 1883
Firearm manufacturers of Spain
Eibar